The  Ministry of Family and Social Services is a government ministry of the Republic of Turkey, responsible for family affairs and social services. The ministry is headed by Derya Yanık.

History
Before the establishment of the ministry in 2011, the portfolio of women and family affairs was executed by a state minister in the cabinet with the help of the Agency for Social Services and Children Protection. The first head of the new established ministry was Fatma Şahin. In 2018, the ministry was merged with the Ministry of Labour and Social Security to form the Ministry of Family, Labour and Social Services. This merger was undone in 2021, making the Labour and Social Security related tasks headed by a separate minister.

Services
The ministry features following branches of service: 
 Family and Public Services (Aile ve Toplum Hizmetleri)
 Children Services (Çocuk Hizmetleri)
 Disabled and Elderly Services (Engelli ve Yaşlı Hizmetleri)
 Status of Women (Kadının Statüsü)
 Social Aids (Sosyal Yardımlar)
 Services for Martyr Relatives and Veterans (Şehit Yakınları ve Gazi Hizmetleri)

Projects and programs

Domestic violence
The ministry worked out a bill on the "Protection of Family and Prevention of Violence Against Women", which passed on March 8, 2012. After the passage of the bill, 800 men in Izmir received a stay away order for a term between three and six months upon application of their wives to the public prosecutor. Ninety women who had been evicted from their home or were at risk of getting killed by their partners found accommodation in women's shelters.

Following the enactment of the law on domestic violence, the ministry put an electronic device called a panic button into service in September 2012 for use by women in emergency situations of a threat. Additionally, a one-touch mobile phone application was in development for emergency police calls.

According to the records of the ministry, a total of 695 people, including 369 women, lost their lives between 2009 and 2012 as a result of domestic violence. The ministry reported in January 2013 that 6,764 women across the country received police protection. Adana Province ranked in first place with 1,605 women.

The ministry continued to be part of lawsuits on honor killings and child abuses. In a timespan of three months in 2012, the ministry got involved in 17 cases. In some cases, however, the court refused the ministry's request.

In January 2014, the ministry prepared and circulated a manual to inform women about domestic violence, listing patterns of abusive behavior in a relationship with a partner.

Disabled and Elderly Care
The ministry started a project in 2012 for the establishment of special centers for the care of people with developmental disabilities and Alzheimer's disease.

Vocational education for women
The ministry, together with the Ministry of National Education, launched a program on "vocational education for women". In one year, it was attended by 780 women from 28 provinces. The most popular class was "Child Care and Technology".

List of ministers

References

External links
 Official website

Family and Social Policy
2011 establishments in Turkey
Turkey
Turkey
Turkey
Turkey, Family and Social Policy
Women's rights in Turkey